Unbreakable Kimmy Schmidt is an American sitcom created by Tina Fey and Robert Carlock, starring Ellie Kemper in the title role. It premiered on March 6, 2015 on Netflix and ran for four seasons, ending on January 25, 2019. An interactive special premiered on May 12, 2020.

The series follows 29-year-old Kimmy Schmidt (Kemper) as she adjusts to life after being rescued from a doomsday cult in the fictional town of Durnsville, Indiana, where she and three other women were held captive by Reverend Richard Wayne Gary Wayne (Jon Hamm) for 15 years. Determined to be seen as something other than a victim and armed only with a positive attitude, she decides to restart her life by moving to New York City, where she quickly befriends her street-wise landlady Lillian Kaushtupper (Carol Kane), finds a roommate in struggling actor Titus Andromedon (Tituss Burgess), and gains a job as a nanny for melancholic and out-of-touch socialite Jacqueline Voorhees (Jane Krakowski).

Throughout its run, the series received critical acclaim, with critic Scott Meslow calling it "the first great sitcom of the streaming era". Despite receiving 20 Primetime Emmy Award nominations, including four nominations for Outstanding Comedy Series and a nomination for Outstanding Television Movie for the 2020 special Kimmy vs. the Reverend, the show won no Emmy awards.

Synopsis 
Kimmy Schmidt (Ellie Kemper) was in eighth grade when she was kidnapped by Reverend Richard Wayne Gary Wayne (Jon Hamm). He held Kimmy and three other women captive for 15 years in an underground bunker and convinced them that a nuclear apocalypse had left them the sole survivors of humanity.

In the first season, the women are rescued, and go on to appear on the Today Show in New York City. After the show, Kimmy decides she doesn't want to return to Indiana or be seen as a victim, so she starts a new life in New York City. Roaming around the city, she comes across landlady Lillian Kaushtupper (Carol Kane), who offers Kimmy a chance to room with Titus Andromedon (Tituss Burgess) in her downstairs apartment. However, to get the apartment, Kimmy has to find a job. When she tries to get a job at a nearby candy store, she sees a boy stealing candy. She pursues him back to his home and encounters his mother, Jacqueline Voorhees (Jane Krakowski), a Manhattan trophy wife, who mistakes her for a nanny, and whom Kimmy mistakes as someone trapped in a cult. Jacqueline hires Kimmy as a nanny for her 10-year-old son. As Season 1 continues, Kimmy falls in love with Dong (Ki Hong Lee), a Vietnamese man from her G.E.D. class; goes to court to testify against the Reverend, and discovers how the world has changed in the 15 years she was held captive. 

In the second season, Kimmy is sick of working for Jacqueline and gets a job at a year-round Christmas store and then as an Uber driver. She tries to get over Dong, who enters a green card marriage with another G.E.D. student and is eventually deported. As Kimmy tries to move on, so do Titus and Jacqueline, who both find boyfriends. Titus begins dating construction worker Mikey Politano (Mike Carlsen) and Jacqueline begins dating lawyer Russ Snyder (David Cross). Jacqueline also goes back to her Native American heritage and decides to take down the Washington Redskins, who her boyfriend's father happens to own. Kimmy reunites with Gretchen and Cyndee to save them from joining another cult and getting married on television, respectively. When Season 2 ends, Titus leaves to be a performer on a cruise and Lillian protests the invasion of hipsters in her neighborhood, while Kimmy makes amends with her mother (Lisa Kudrow) after advice from her therapist (Tina Fey) before receiving a phone call from the Reverend in prison, telling her that they need to get a divorce.

In the third season, Kimmy proceeds with the divorce from the Reverend but hits a snag when she learns that a devoted fan (guest star Laura Dern) wants to marry him. After getting her G.E.D., Kimmy decides to go to college and ends up at Columbia University, where she is popular but fails academically. She forms a friendship with Perry (Daveed Diggs), a philosophy and religion transfer student who, like Kimmy, does not fit in with the rich, elitist Ivy League students. Titus returns from his stint on the cruise harboring a secret and, determined to come home to Mikey with money and a job, he auditions for Sesame Street. However, after the man auditioning Titus asks him to perform sexual acts on a puppet, Titus leaves and runs home to Mikey. However, Titus sees Mikey out with another man, and breaks up with him. Lillian is elected to the city council and attempts to block the construction of a supermarket chain for fear it will gentrify the neighborhood. She later starts a relationship with the owner of the chain (Peter Riegert). Meanwhile, Jacqueline and Russ execute their plan to force his family to change the name of the Redskins and Titus makes it big with the single "Boobs in California". At the end of season three, Titus vows to win Mikey back from his new boyfriend, Jacqueline finds a profession, and Kimmy lands a job at a tech start-up.

In the fourth and final season, Kimmy is working at Giztoob, the tech company started by a former classmate at Columbia, and Jacqueline is representing Titus as his agent. After acting in an anti-bullying performance for a middle school, Titus gets a job as director of the school play and, in an attempt to impress Mikey, pretends to write and star in a superhero television show called The Capist, starring Greg Kinnear. Meanwhile, Lillian's boyfriend Artie dies and she is put in charge of his adult daughter's trust. Kimmy reunites with Donna Maria, who is now a successful businesswoman. Outraged and inspired by men's rights activists, Kimmy writes a children's book that empowers girls and encourages boys to be kind; by the end of season four, Kimmy has found success as a children's author. Season 4 features two episodes that veer from the main plot. In the first, a standalone mockumentary episode, Jacqueline's former boy toy Doug, a.k.a. DJ Fingablast, creates a true crime documentary called Party Monster: Scratching the Surface, which sympathizes with the Reverend and paints Kimmy and the other Mole Women negatively. The second episode, "Sliding Van Doors", presents an alternate universe in which Kimmy is never kidnapped, Titus does not audition for The Lion King in 1998, Jacqueline does not marry Julian Voorhees, and Lillian runs a Latin street gang. The series concludes with each of the main four characters finding success and purpose in new ventures.

Episodes

Cast and characters

Main

 Ellie Kemper as Kimberly "Kimmy" Cougar Schmidt, the titular character. Armed with only unflagging optimism,  a childlike sense of wonder and an eighth-grade education, she attempts to regain the life that was taken from her and navigate her way through the unfamiliar struggles of New York life.
 Tituss Burgess as Titus Andromedon (born Ronald Wilkerson), Kimmy's gay, flamboyant roommate and an aspiring actor and singer. Melodramatic and self-absorbed, Titus nevertheless cares deeply for, and is very protective of Kimmy. Despite his talent and ego, he is plagued by self-doubt after years of rejection in the business. Titus hails from Chickasaw County, Mississippi, and moved to New York City in 1998.
 Carol Kane as Lillian Kaushtupper, Kimmy and Titus' odd landlady. A proud born-and-bred New Yorker with a long, complex criminal history, she fights against the possible gentrification of her neighborhood (although it soon becomes clear that she hates any form of progress or technology). Despite her willingness to do anything to make a buck, she has a very big heart and will go out of her way to help her tenants.
 Jane Krakowski as Jacqueline White (formerly Voorhees; née Jackie Lynn White), a wealthy and insecure socialite who hires Kimmy as a nanny. Despite coming across as arrogant, condescending and out of touch, she is very fond of (and heavily reliant on) her new employee, who helps her gain perspective on her unhappy marriage. She is secretly of Lakota Native American descent and is passing for white. As the series progresses, she gradually reconnects with her family and her culture. She is the mother of Buckley Voorhees and the former step-mother of Xanthippe Lannister Voorhees. Her ex-husband is Julian Voorhees.

Recurring

Guest

Production

Development

The show was created by Tina Fey and Robert Carlock when NBC executives asked them to develop a show for Ellie Kemper. Fey said that they found an "innocence" about Kemper's face, but also noted a "strength" to it. One idea was for the show to center on Kemper's character waking up from a coma, but this idea was abandoned in favor of the cult-survivor storyline.

The show was initially under development for NBC under the title Tooken. NBC ultimately sold the series to Netflix. Fey said that this was in partly due to NBC's "not feeling confident about watching comedies". Prior to the sale, NBC planned to air the series as either a mid-season replacement or as a summer series. The show was sold to Netflix with a two-season order.

On June 13, 2017, the show was renewed for a fourth and final season, with the first 6 episodes premiering on May 30, 2018. The second half was released on January 25, 2019. On May 8, 2019, it was announced that the series would return with an interactive special; it premiered on May 12, 2020.

Casting
Casting announcements for the remaining roles were made in March 2014, with Tituss Burgess cast as Kimmy's roommate, Titus, and Carol Kane as Kimmy's and Titus's landlady, Lillian.

Shortly afterwards, Sara Chase was cast Cyndee, Kimmy's closest friend during their years in the cult; and Lauren Adams as Gretchen, a 10-year member of the cult who believes everything she is told. Jane Krakowski was later cast as Jacqueline Voorhees, a wealthy Manhattanite who hires Kimmy as a nanny. Megan Dodds was originally cast before Krakowski replaced her.

Music
The show's theme song, "Unbreakable", was produced by The Gregory Brothers and written by Jeff Richmond. It is a tribute to The Gregory Brothers' YouTube show Songify the News – auto-tuned news interviews that became popular videos. It specifically parodies the mannerisms of Antoine Dodson in the "Bed Intruder Song". Richmond also wrote "Peeno Noir", a song performed by character Titus Andromedon during season 1, episode 6.

Artwork
Artwork for the show's opening sequence was produced by a team at Pentagram that included feminist artist Deva Pardue.

Home video releases

Reception

The show has been widely acclaimed by television critics, who have praised the writing and cast.

Season 1 
On Rotten Tomatoes, the first season has a rating of 95%, based on 55 reviews, with an average rating of 7.5/10. The site's critical consensus reads, "Blessed with originality and a spot-on performance from Ellie Kemper, The Unbreakable Kimmy Schmidt is as odd as it is hilarious." On Metacritic, the first season has a score of 78 out of 100, based on 29 critics, indicating "generally favorable reviews".

Scott Meslow of The Week called the series "the first great sitcom of the streaming era", praising its wit, edge, and feminist tone. Brian Moylan of The Guardian noted that it is "the sort of show that could benefit from multiple viewings, because the jokes are so packed in you’re sure to miss something while laughing." TV Guide named it the "best new comedy of 2015". IGN reviewer Max Nicholson gave the first season an 8.3 out of 10 'Great' rating, saying "Tina Fey and Robert Carlock's Unbreakable Kimmy Schmidt is another winner in Netflix's original series catalog. Not only is it charming and funny, but it's unabashedly kooky, and Ellie Kemper nails the lead role."

The first season was nominated for seven Primetime Emmy Awards.

Some reviewers have criticized the show's portrayal of Native Americans, with Vulture referring to a prominent Native American subplot as "offensive". BuzzFeed wrote that the show has a "major race problem" and cited the lack of a plurality of portrayals of Native Americans as the main issue with the subplot, stating that "the way Native Americans are represented on this show matters. It's not one representation among a cornucopia of representations; it's the single mainstream representation in years." The Daily Beast stated that when it comes to race, “especially in its portrayal of a key Vietnamese character, the show leaves much to be desired.”

In the wake of the controversy, Tina Fey responded: "I feel like we put so much effort into writing and crafting everything, they need to speak for themselves. There's a real culture of demanding apologies, and I'm opting out of that."

Season 2 
On Rotten Tomatoes, the second season holds a 100% approval rating, based on 24 reviews, with an average rating of 7.6/10. The site's critical consensus reads, "Not letting up in season two, Unbreakable Kimmy Schmidt is still odd in the best of ways, wonderfully building on its unique comedy stylings and brilliantly funny cast." On Metacritic, the second season has a score of 82 out of 100, based on 16 reviews, indicating "universal acclaim".

The second season was nominated for four Primetime Emmy Awards.

There was controversy surrounding the third episode from this season, “Kimmy Goes to a Play!,” which involved the use of yellow-face and the name of a group of Asian-Americans who were critical of yellow-face. The group is referred to as "Respectful Asian Portrayals in Entertainment", or "R.A.P.E" for short. The Asian-Americans shown protesting against yellow-face in the episode are conveyed as unlikable buffoons. Anna Akana criticized the use of yellow-face and the R.A.P.E. acronym during her 2016 Asians in Entertainment Key Note speech. Alex Abad-Santos wrote, “The odd thing about this episode is that it's another Tina Fey project that paints Asian people, specifically Asian women, as crappy characters. [...] The plot feels like a pointed, ironic response to anyone who has criticized Fey's past projects for being lazy and racist.”

Season 3 
On Rotten Tomatoes, the third season holds a 97% approval rating, based on 29 reviews, with an average rating of 8.11/10. The site's critical consensus states: "Unbreakable Kimmy Schmidt continues to thrive with a comically agile cast, notable guest stars, and a forceful influx of funny." On Metacritic, the third season has a score of 78 out of 100, based on 12 reviews, indicating "generally favorable reviews".

The third season was nominated for five Primetime Emmy Awards.

Season 4 
On Rotten Tomatoes, the fourth season holds a 94% approval rating, based on 32 reviews, with an average rating of 7.77/10. The site's critical consensus states: "Unbreakable Kimmy Schmidt ends with a final season that's as topical as it is cheerily irreverent." On Metacritic, the fourth season has a score of 85 out of 100, based on 6 reviews, indicating "universal acclaim".

The fourth season was nominated for two Primetime Emmy Awards.

Special 

On Rotten Tomatoes, the Unbreakable Kimmy Schmidt: Kimmy vs. the Reverend special has an approval rating of 94%, based on 32 reviews, with an average rating of 7.81/10. The site's critical consensus reads: "Kimmy and company return as resilient as ever in a fun and fast paced special that makes excellent use of its interactive capabilities to produce maximum fabulosity."

The special was nominated for two Primetime Emmy Awards.

References

External links
 
 
 

 
2015 American television series debuts
2019 American television series endings
2010s American LGBT-related comedy television series
2010s American single-camera sitcoms
2010s American sitcoms
2010s LGBT-related sitcoms
American LGBT-related sitcoms
English-language Netflix original programming
Fictional cults
Television series about cults
Television series by 3 Arts Entertainment
Television series by Universal Television
Television series created by Tina Fey
Television shows filmed in New York (state)
Television shows set in Indiana
Television shows set in New York City